The Patna–Gaya Passenger is a Express train belonging to East Central Railway zone that runs between  and  in India. It is currently being operated with 53213/53214 train numbers on a daily basis.

Service

The 53213/Patna–Gaya Passenger has an average speed of 30 km/hr and covers 92 km in 3h 5m. The 53214/Gaya–Patna Passenger has an average speed of 29 km/hr and covers 92 km in 3h 10m.

Route and halts 

The important halts of the train are:

Coach composition

The train has standard ICF rakes with max speed of 110 kmph. The train consists of 14 coaches:

 12 General
 2 Seating cum Luggage Rake

Traction

Both trains are hauled by a Mughal Sarai Loco Shed-based WAM-4 electric locomotive from Patna to Gaya and vice versa.

Rake sharing

The train shares its rake with

 13249/13250 Patna–Bhabua Road Intercity Express
 13243/13244 Patna–Bhabua Road Intercity Express (via Gaya)
 53211/53212 Patna–Sasaram Passenger

See also 

 Patna Junction railway station
 Bhabua Road railway station
 Patna–Bhabua Road Intercity Express (via Gaya)
 Patna–Bhabua Road Intercity Express
 Patna–Sasaram Passenger

Notes

References

External links 

 53213/Patna–Gaya Passenger
 53214/Gaya–Patna Passenger

Transport in Patna
Transport in Gaya, India
Slow and fast passenger trains in India
Rail transport in Bihar